Zelenomorsk is a rural locality (a selo) in Karabudakhkentsky District, Republic of Dagestan, Russia. The population was 1,005 as of 2010. There are 21 streets.

Geography 
Zelenomorsk is located 17 km northeast of Karabudakhkent (the district's administrative centre) by road. Manaskent and Manas are the nearest rural localities.

Nationalities 
Dargins and Kumyks live there.

References 

Rural localities in Karabudakhkentsky District